Maravil Thirivu Sookshikkuka is a 1972 Indian Malayalam-language crime thriller film, directed by J. Sasikumar and produced by R. S. Rajan. The film stars Prem Nazir, Vijayasree, Adoor Bhasi and Thikkurissy Sukumaran Nair. The film had musical score by G. Devarajan.

Plot 
Jayadevan is a script writer who goes to a hill station to write his new script. In that place there is a mysterious deviation which kills drivers. Jayadevan unfolds the mystery behind it.

Cast 

Prem Nazir as Jayadevan
Vijayasree as Indumathi
Adoor Bhasi as Kaduva Kurian
Thikkurissy Sukumaran Nair as K. B. Menon
Ushakumari as Maalu
Sreelatha Namboothiri as Chinnamma
T. S. Muthaiah as Watchman Muniyandi
Baby Indira as Baijumon
Baby Shylaja
Bahadoor as Puncture Anthony
Meena as Allu Maria
N. Govindankutty as Thampi
Pala Thankam as Jayadevan's mother
Paravoor Bharathan as Wan Lan/Esthappan
Thodupuzha Radhakrishnan as Film Producer
Vanchiyoor Radha as Valsamma
Vincent as Murukan
Santo Krishnan as Gopalan

Soundtrack 
The music was composed by G. Devarajan and the lyrics were written by Vayalar Ramavarma.

References

External links 
 

1972 films
1970s Malayalam-language films
1970s crime thriller films
Films directed by J. Sasikumar